Girls High School Harare ("GHSH") was founded in 1898, the first public school for girls in the city of Salisbury, Rhodesia (now Harare, Zimbabwe). The school can teach over 1,000 girls across all forms, making it the largest girls' high school in Zimbabwe. The school has two boarding houses for girls, called Beit House and Forsyth House. The school celebrated its centenary in 1998 with pomp and a fair. In the year 1998, all the old uniforms were brought back and pupils were given a chance to purchase the many uniforms that the school had in previous years.

The school is located in Harare's central business district.

Girls High School is the sister school to the boys school Prince Edward High School.

The school motto is "Per Ardua Ad Astra" ("Through hard work, we will reach the stars").

The school colours are bottle-green and gold. The school uniform for junior girls is the traditional green pinafore with white blouse, and the school for senior girls (A level students) is the traditional "butcher blazer" with stripes, and green skirts.

Academics and extra-curricular activities
The school offers educational certificates for Ordinary Levels (O Levels) and Advanced Levels (A Levels). Subjects offered include:

 Art
 Accounting
 Geography
 Mathematics
 General Science
 Physics
 Biology
 Chemistry
 History
 Management of business
 Divinity
 Shona Language
 French
 Economics
 Food Science
 Fashion & Fabrics
 English Literature
 English Language
 Advanced Mathematics

The school also offers various sporting and extra curricular activities which include the following:

 Drum majorettes
 Debate Society
 Drama Club
 Scripture Union Club
 Action 21 Environmental Club
 Choir
 Marimba Club
 Rotary Club
 Athletics
 Swimming
 Hockey
 Netball
 Tennis
 Rowing
 Softball
 Martial Arts
° WRITERS CLUB

Notable alumnae 

Tracy Cox-Smyth, springboard diver.
Doris Lessing,   novelist and Nobel Laureate.
 Na'ima B. Robert (born Thando Mclaren), author.
Liz Chase, field hockey player
 Tabetha Kanengoni-Malinga, businesswoman and politician

References

External links
 School website

Schools in Harare
Girls' schools in Zimbabwe
Girls' high schools in Zimbabwe
High schools in Zimbabwe
Educational institutions established in 1898
1898 establishments in the British Empire